Yuriy Chyrkov (22 December 1947 – 19 April 2014) is a former professional Soviet football midfielder and coach.

References

External links
 

1947 births
2014 deaths
Soviet footballers
Ukrainian footballers
FC Karpaty Mukacheve players
FC Hoverla Uzhhorod players
Ukrainian football managers
FC Hoverla Uzhhorod managers
Association football midfielders
Sportspeople from Zakarpattia Oblast